Bornholm's Self-Government Party is a local political party in Denmark, which seeks to establish the independence or autonomy of Bornholm, a small island in the Baltic Sea with a population of slightly below 40,000 people. Founded in the 1990s, the party has seen only minor successes, securing at most a few hundred votes at a time.

History
Bornholm forms part of the ancient Lands of Denmark, many of which were originally petty kingdoms or chiefdoms. It's the official stance of the Bornholm's Self-Government Party that the island was governed by its own petty king during the Viking Age. Regardless, Bornholm ended up hotly contested ground between different Danish factions, and the site of frequent battles. During the 16th century, starting 1525, the island was pawned to Lübeck for 50 years. From 1624 and on it had its own militia, Bornholms Milits. Ceded to Sweden – together with Scania, to which it belonged, along with other provinces such as Bohuslän – in the 1658 Treaty of Roskilde, the island's population threw out the Swedes the same year. As a reward for returning to King Frederick III, Bornholm received a promise never to be ceded again. First occupied by Nazi Germany during the Second World War, Bornholm saw heavy damage during the war, and was also occupied by the Soviet Union until 1946.

Since the Second World War, Bornholm has seen a demographic decline, with a large drop in population numbers and birth rates, as well as employment issues. Due to these issues, and in response to the taxes paid by Bornholm to the central government, the master builder Tonny Borrinjaland founded Bornholm's Self-Government Party in the early 1990s. It has since participated in six municipal elections, gaining 299 votes in the 2009 elections and 190 votes in 2013.

During the run-up to the September 2014 2014 Scottish independence referendum, the party expressed its sympathies for the cause of Scottish independence, and stated that it had a lot to learn from the Scots. Party leader Borrinjaland also pointed to Malta and Singapore as two other models that Bornholm should learn from.

Strongly in favour of preserving the endangered Bornholmsk dialect, Borrinjaland has gone as far as to translate the New Testament to the local language. Commenting on his views regarding Bornholmsk, he stated: "Today, it is almost forbidden to talk Bornholmsk in kindergartens and schools on the island. That has Denmark with pure dictatorship taken care since many years. It's scandalous, I mean. Therefore, we must ensure that children learn the language, so they at least can choose whether to speak Bornholmsk or not." Borrinjaland was also purportedly behind the launch of the flag of Bornholm, a red and green Nordic Cross flag designed by a local painter and published in a local newspaper in 1975.

See also

 Danish Realm
 Faroese independence movement
 Greenlandic independence
 Icelandic independence movement
 Scania Party

References

Bornholm
Pro-independence parties
Regionalist parties
Separatism in Denmark
Secessionist organizations in Europe
Local political parties in Denmark
Political parties with year of establishment missing